Motilal Nehru College (MLNC) is one of the largest constituent colleges of the University of Delhi. It awards degrees under the purview of the university and offers courses in science, humanities and commerce disciplines at the undergraduate level.
There is also an evening college operating in the same campus premises called Motilal Nehru College Evening.

History 
The college is named after Pandit Motilal Nehru, a great leader, freedom fighter and progenitor of a line of illustrious Prime ministers. Established in 1964 in a government school building with an enrollment of 300 students, it now has over 140 faculty members and 3,000 students coming from all parts of India. Since its foundation in 1964 to 1966, the college was known as Government Degree College; from 1966 to 1977 as Hastinapur College; and on 10 January 1977, it was named as Motilal Nehru College. The college moved to its new location with a sprawling campus, extensive lawns, a large administrative block, library, and well equipped laboratories and air-conditioned computer science laboratory in 1989. The college celebrated its Golden Jubilee in 2014.

Campus 
The college is situated on Benito Juarez Marg, on the South Campus of Delhi University, PIN - 110021. It is connected via the Outer Ring Road and by the  Delhi metro. Near by metro station is Durgabai Deshmukh South Campus. The nearby locality is Vasant Gaon which is connected by DTC, within 200 meters of the college premises.

Organisation and administration 
Dr. Shrivatsa is the Acting Principal of the college and supervised the various activities of the college through designated committees. The Principal is also a Member Secretary of the governing body. Sh. Khem Chand and Sh. Virendra Singh Kadian are the chairman and Treasurer of the Governing Body respectively. Several members are nominated from various walks of public life to its Governing Body as per provisions of statute 30(1)(c)(i) of Delhi University Act, 1922.

Academics

Courses offered

Undergraduate 
 B.A. (Hons) Economics
 B.A. (Hons)  English
 B.A. (Hons) Hindi
 B.A. (Hons) History
 B.A. (Hons) Political Science
 B.A. (Hons) Sanskrit
 B.A. Programme
 B.Com.
 B.Com. (Hons)
 B.Sc.  Applied Physical Science
 B.Sc. Physical Sciences with Chemistry
 B.Sc. Physical Sciences with Computer
 B.Sc. Physical Sciences
 B.Sc. Physical Sciences
 B.Sc. (Hons) Chemistry
 B.Sc. (Hons) Mathematics
 B.Sc. (Hons) Physics

Post-graduate 
 M.A. Hindi
 M.A. Political Science
 M.Com.
Admissions and teaching of these courses is handled at the university level. Tutorials are held in the college.

Library 

The library has a collection of over 1,07,586 volumes of books and subscribes to 86 periodicals. The library has 21 computer stations with Internet access. It is a single storey building, which is scattered in a very large space. It is one of the best libraries of Delhi University. A stationery shop and xerox facility are also available within the campus.

Other facilities
Other well-known facilities in the college are in economics and political science faculty departments, which attract students from all over the country. Recently, the college introduced a new facility for movie screenings, called Bioscope. A new state-of-art computer lab and seminar room have been constructed.

Workshops 
In 2006 the Department of History organized a national seminar/workshop on "Exploring Delhi", which was a huge success, getting recognition from the Prime Minister and the President of India. In 2007 the department produced four first divisioners in the History honours course. The history department has turned out to be one of the known faces of the university. In 2007, it was named Antiquity by the department and since then many national seminars and films screenings have been organised.

Exchange programmes 
In the 2007-08 session, the college participated in exchange program with Pusan University of Foreign Studies, Korea which was appreciated by the Delhi government.

Student life

Students' union 
The students of the college play the roles of active members of DUSU and the campus witness a rampant campaigning during the election season in September. Some of its students have managed to secure tickets at the DUSU elections.

College magazine 
The college magazine Navagat publishes reviews of educational, cultural, social and sports activities of the college and articles by the students and staff.

Cultural activities 
The college has an active cultural society which has won various competitions at the university and national level in the past years, including with institutes like IIT Bombay, IIT Kanpur, IIT Delhi, BITS Pilani, and Delhi University NEXUS. Moti Lal Nehru College was one of the nine colleges which participated in the Sahitya Akadami's poetry competition.

Aadhaar is the dramatics society of the college. The Electra dance society, Malhar music society and Bellissimo The fashion society are other notable societies active in the college.

Placement Cell 
The college has a very active Placement Cell along with the Career Development Center which looks into the placement for its students from all streams. The objective of the Placement Cell is to help students identify their career goals and provide an edge into the competitive job market. It  organizes resume workshops, provides internships to students in various organizations during summer breaks, and prepares students for jobs.

Notable alumni
 Basant Pandey, Founder and CEO mycbseguide
 Praveen Kumar (Para athlete), Silver medalist (Men's high jump T64)
 Karan Singh Tanwar, MLA, Delhi Cantt., New Delhi
 Sat Prakash Rana, MLA, Delhi
 Papon, playback singer Angarag Mahanta
 Shambhu Shikhar, Poet, Comedian

References

External links 
 Evening College
 University of Delhi
 College details

Delhi University
Universities and colleges in Delhi
Educational institutions established in 1964
1964 establishments in Delhi